The 2013 Strathcona County municipal election was held Monday, October 21, 2013. From 1968 to 2013, provincial legislation has required every municipality to hold elections every three years. The Alberta Legislative Assembly passed a bill on December 5, 2012, amending the Local Authorities Election Act. Starting with the 2013 elections, officials are elected for a four-year term, and municipal elections are moved to a four-year cycle.

The citizens of Strathcona County, Alberta, elected one mayor, eight councillors (one from each of eight wards), five of the Elk Island Public Schools Regional Division No. 14's nine trustees (three from subdivision #2, and one from each of subdivisions #3 and #4), and five of the Elk Island Catholic Separate Regional Division No. 41's seven trustees (supporters in Sherwood Park and Fort Saskatchewan). Strathcona County includes Sherwood Park, an urban service area deemed equivalent of a city.

Results
Bold indicates elected, and incumbents are italicized.

Mayor

Councillors

Public School Trustees
The Elk Island Public School Board consists of nine trustees, one from Lamont County, two from Fort Saskatchewan, three from Sherwood Park (subdivision 2), one from Strathcona County north (subdivision 3), one from Strathcona County south (subdivision 4), and one from the County of Minburn No. 27.

Separate School Trustees
The Elk Island Catholic Separate School Board consists of seven trustees, four from Sherwood Park, one from Camrose, one from Vegreville, and one from Fort Saskatchewan.

References

2013 Alberta municipal elections
2013